John Storey or Story may refer to:

John Story (martyr) (1504–1571), or Storey, English Roman Catholic martyr and member of parliament
John Storey (politician) (1869–1921), Australian politician, premier of New South Wales
John Storey (rower) (born 1987), New Zealand Olympic rower
John D. Storey, American scientist
John Douglas Story (1869–1966), Australian civil servant, public service commissioner of Queensland
John Story (businessman), Australian businessman, grandson of John Douglas Story
John Story (cricketer) (1812–1872), English cricketer and British Army officer
John Patten Story (1841–1915), United States Army general

See also
Jack Storey (disambiguation)